The Himachal Pradesh football team is an Indian football team representing Himachal Pradesh in Indian state football competitions including the  Santosh Trophy.

They have failed to qualify for the final rounds of most Santosh Trophy editions.

References

Santosh Trophy teams
Football in Himachal Pradesh